Portada's (translation Front Page) is a Venezuelan Spanish language show produced by and broadcast live by Venevisión. The show is aired Monday to Friday from 10:00 am to noon and follows a News magazine format and addressees a variety of topics covering family life from national to international events. The show's segments offer a variety of entertainment featuring food, gossip, games, humor, celebrity interviews and more.

History
Portada's began in 2005 with Leonardo Villalobos, Chiquinquirá Delgado, Francisco León, Mariangel Ruiz and Zoraya Villarreal as the show's first presenters.

In 2014, the show celebrated its 9th anniversary being on air.

Presenters

References

External links

Venezuelan television news shows
Venevisión original programming
2005 Venezuelan television series debuts
2000s Venezuelan television series
2010s Venezuelan television series